Éva Olsavszky (Budapest, 18 September 1929 – 27 February 2021) was a Hungarian actress. She co-founded the National Theater from 1980 and the Katona József Theater from 1982.

References

External links
 

1929 births
2021 deaths
Hungarian actresses
Actresses from Budapest